Cornus rugosa, commonly called roundleaf dogwood, is a deciduous tree native to northern parts of the eastern and central United States and southern parts of central and eastern Canada.

Description
Pith is white. Leafs are oppositely arranged, round orbicularly shaped with an acuminate tip, have an entire margin, and are woolly to hairless below. Leaves have 6-8 pairs of lateral veins and 7–15 cm long. Leaf scars are broadly U-shaped with 3 bundle scars.

White flowers appear in early summer arranged on flat topped cymes. The flowers themselves are pedunculate with 4 calyx lobes and 4 petals. Fruits are blue to greenish white drupe that matures in October.

Roundleaf dogwood prefers well drained to normal moisture soil and, like most dogwoods, is shade tolerant.

Ecology
Roundleaf dogwood is a host species for the spring azure and gossamer wings.

Fruits are eaten by ruffed grouse and sharp-tailed grouse. Twigs are consumed by white tailed deer, Eastern cottontail, and mice.

Conservation 
Roundleaf dogwood is listed as endangered in Maryland and is a species of special concern in Rhode Island

References

External links
 

rugosa